"Massage Therapy" is the fourth episode of the seventh season of the American medical drama House. It aired on October 11, 2010.

Plot

A young woman, Margaret,  (Erin Cahill) is home alone. She hears a noise, notices the front door was open and calls her husband, Billy (Zachary Knighton). She searches the house, fearing intruders. It turns out to be nothing but the wind, but when she runs into Billy arriving downstairs, she begins projectile vomiting.

House (Hugh Laurie) is introduced to Kelly Benedict (Vinessa Shaw), the new fellow Chase (Jesse Spencer) hired. Not surprisingly House doesn't give her a warm reception. A few ideas are tossed around about the vomiting woman, one of which is lead poisoning.

House tells Wilson (Robert Sean Leonard) he and Cuddy (Lisa Edelstein) aren't spending the night together at her place and he isn't spending any time with Cuddy's daughter. While working on Margaret, Chase assures Kelly not to worry about the cool reception she got from House and Foreman (Omar Epps). They notice multiple broken ribs, something she never told the doctors about.

At Margaret's house, Foreman denies having feelings for Thirteen (Olivia Wilde). They find a credit card receipt from a lunch Margaret never mentioned. Margaret tells the docs the lunch was an honest mistake and the fractures are a decade old. House is less than romantic the next time Cuddy leaves his place. As she leaves, an attractive blonde masseuse arrives.

Doing research into her past, Kelly finds Margaret is using the social security number of a woman born in the 1940s. Meanwhile Margaret seizes with a heart attack. Margaret wakes up to House asking who she is. She tells Billy that five years ago she was married to an abusive man. She left him, but he found her, stalked her and poisoned her dog. She took a dead woman's identity to escape the man (named Carl). She tells them her real name is Jenny.

House grills Kelly for answers about Jenny's dueling stomach/heart issues. She doesn't come up with anything. House suggests the ex used the poison with which he killed the dog to poison Jenny as well. Foreman isn't convinced Kelly is talented enough to work with them. He thinks Chase wants to sleep with her.

Billy is upset she never told him about the abusive ex and leaves. Cuddy asks House about the masseuse. House says she is a hooker he used to get "happy endings" from. After going through 15 different massage therapists, this is the only one he likes. Cuddy says she won't see him any more unless he stops seeing the hooker/masseuse.

Chase learns from Kelly she was not, in fact, the lead editor for the paper at her medical school. She asks if he regrets hiring her, but he says no. Chase gets a page that Billy has just been admitted to the ER. House tells Wilson the hooker/masseuse issue will set a principle for the entire relationship. Wilson thinks he needs to make this sacrifice to save the relationship.

Billy tells the doctors he found a guy named Carl in Jenny's address book and went to see him. When Carl denied everything, Billy got upset and then got beaten up. Carl is not pressing charges, but Kelly thinks Billy should. Carl said he was just a guy Jenny used to work with. Jenny's temperature begins to spike.

House shows a picture of Chase's mother on a projector and suggests the similarity in appearance to Kelly is why he hired her. Kelly mentions Legionnaires' disease. House decides they should look into it. Foreman figures out it was actually Chase who came up with the Legionnaires' disease idea and told that to Kelly during prep.

In the hallway, Chase wants to know why Foreman is so upset about Kelly being unqualified. He guesses Foreman is picking on her because he's scared to take on House. House hires an attractive man named Felipe (Eddie Matos) to give Cuddy a massage. She tries to get out of it but ends up getting the massage. During the massage, she figures out he is a male prostitute.

Kelly is stressed-out and tells Chase she's considering quitting. Chase counters she should lean on her background in psychiatry. Billy tells Kelly he found out that the abuse counseling center in Trenton that Jenny claimed to have visited does not exist. He's worried she could be lying about any number of things, but Kelly tells him to relax for the time being.

House tells Cuddy he isn't bothered by a male prostitute giving her a massage and she should treat him the same way. She points out the difference in the situation and wonders whether this is House's way of sabotaging the relationship. House responds that she should invite him over and introduce him to her daughter. She says she wants to protect her daughter and this makes House think she's holding back.

When Jenny wakes up, Billy calmly asks her about the lies. During this conversation she begins to hallucinate, seeing flames and snakes all over the room. House wakes up alone. The doctors assume whatever is happening has hit Jenny's brain. Kelly is the only one to suggest these latest symptoms could be unrelated, simply the first signs of mental illness. House orders a brain biopsy.

During surgery, Jenny's temperature breaks. House talks with Kelly, Taub (Peter Jacobson) and Chase and they realize her temperature could have been gone since the day before and that she hasn't vomited since being admitted. House goes to the OR and turns off Jenny's pacemaker. Nothing happens. All that's left of her symptoms are her delusions. Kelly wonders if maybe they were prompted by the physical symptoms. House thinks it was just the opposite and orders that Jenny be treated with haloperidol and lorazepam.

House talks to the still-hallucinating but calm Jenny. He goes through all of her lies (former husband, treatments, etc.) and has her admit to Billy that she has schizophrenia. On his way out of the room, House makes a crack about Kelly not being able to figure this out from the beginning.

Billy goes to House and tells him he thinks it may be too hard to live with her now. "It's always hard," House says. In the elevator, Chase tells House he should probably get rid of Kelly. House disagrees, since she was the only one to get him to the right answer.

House agrees he will stop seeing his hooker/masseuse. Cuddy invites him over. Chase finds Kelly packing up her stuff to quit. She is going to leave, but Chase asks her if she is free for dinner.

House, Cuddy, and her daughter have dinner together. "Aren't you adorable," he says to her when Cuddy leaves the room.

Reception

Critical response 
The AV Club gave the episode a C+ score.

References

External links 
 "Massage Therapy" at Fox.com
 

House (season 7) episodes
2010 American television episodes
Television episodes about schizophrenia
Television episodes directed by David Straiton

fr:Le Message du massage